The .32 H&R Magnum is a rimmed cartridge designed for use in revolvers.  It was developed and introduced in 1984 as a joint venture between Harrington & Richardson and  Federal Premium Ammunition. The .32 H&R Magnum is produced by lengthening the .32 S&W Long case by .155", to 1.075".

Performance
The .32 H&R Magnum offers substantially more performance than most other .32 caliber handgun cartridges, such as the .32 ACP, and is considered an effective small-game hunting cartridge. Its higher velocity offers a flat trajectory, while the light weight of the bullet results in low recoil.

Maximum pressure for the .32 H&R Magnum is set at 21,000 CUP by SAAMI.

Use
In 2013, Hornady introduced a .32 H&R Magnum "Critical Defense" cartridge designed for self-defense. It propels an 80 grain FTX (flex tip), bullet at 1,150 fps muzzle velocity. Buffalo Bore offers +P rated cartridges with either a 100 gr. JHP or a 130 gr. Keith hard cast SWC bullets.

Since the .32 H&R Magnum headspaces on the rim and shares the rim dimensions and case and bullet diameters of the shorter .32 S&W and .32 S&W Long cartridges, these shorter cartridges may be safely fired in arms chambered for the .32 H&R Magnum. However, the longer, more powerful .32 H&R Magnum cartridges can not be safely fired in arms designed for the .32 S&W or .32 S&W Long.

Firearms chambered for the .32 H&R Magnum

Handguns
In addition to Harrington & Richardson, other manufacturers who have offered revolvers in .32 H&R Magnum include Dan Wesson Firearms, Charter Arms (professional 7 round revolver), Freedom Arms, Smith & Wesson (J and K frames), Ruger (Blackhawk, Single-Six, GP100, SP101, Ruger LCR and LCRx), Taurus, and New England Firearms (NEF).

American Derringer, Bond Arms, and Cobra Firearms offer derringers in .32 H&R Magnum, while Thompson Center Arms offered their Contender pistol in it.

Rifles
Marlin offered the Model 1894CB lever-action rifle in .32 H&R Magnum. Unlike other Marlin 1894s, the 1894CB loads from the front of the tubular 10-shot magazine, like their Model 39A rimfire rifle, and has a faster, 10% shorter throw, lever action. It has a 20" tapered octagonal barrel, an overall length of 37.5" and weighs 6.5 lbs.

Gallery

See also
8 mm caliber
List of handgun cartridges
Table of handgun and rifle cartridges

References

External links
Cartridge Dimensions at Steves Pages
Chuck Hawks .32 H&R Magnum page
Ballistics By The Inch .32H&R results.

Pistol and rifle cartridges
Magnum pistol cartridges